Glenn Hunter may refer to:

 Glenn Hunter (footballer) (born 1967), former footballer from Northern Ireland
 Glenn Hunter (actor) (1894–1945), stage and silent film actor